Nijolė Ambrazaitytė (21 February 1939 in Lazdijai district, Lithuania – 27 November 2016) was an opera singer, politician, and signatory of the 1990 Act of the Re-Establishment of the State of Lithuania.

Biography
Ambrazaitytė's parents moved to Germany during World War II and later to Canada; she was brought up by her grandparents in a village in the Raseiniai district. She was deported to Siberia in 1948, returning in 1956 to study at the Lithuanian State Conservatoire. Her career as a singer began in 1966; she has released about 30 recordings and has performed in various international opera houses. Ambrazaitytė, elected to the Supreme Council of Lithuania in 1990, the Seimas in 1992 and the Seventh Seimas in 1996 has also served as a member of the Commission on State Pensions.

In 1996, she received the Order of the Lithuanian Grand Duke Gediminas, third class.

Ambrazaitytė died on 27 November 2016.

References

1939 births
2016 deaths
Burials at Antakalnis Cemetery
Lithuanian opera singers
Women members of the Seimas
Commander's Crosses of the Order of the Lithuanian Grand Duke Gediminas
People's Artists of the USSR
20th-century Lithuanian women singers
21st-century Lithuanian women singers
20th-century women opera singers
21st-century women opera singers
Signatories of the Act of the Re-Establishment of the State of Lithuania
Members of the Seimas